Francis Ebo Cann also known us Dr Cann was a Ghanaian broadcaster.

Career
He worked for radio stations like GBC Radio in Accra, Radio Winaby in Cape Coast and Sunrise FM in Koforidua. He finally joined Happy FM where he was the host of Showbiz Extra and Ayeeko Ayeeko an entertainment show.

Death
He had a short illness that led to his death.

References

20th-century births
2022 deaths
Ghanaian radio presenters